Ravens Košice RC is a Slovakian rugby club based in Košice. They currently only compete in sevens.

History
The club was officially founded on 20 February 2010 after a series of informal meetings in 2009. Rugby activity in Košice first took place in 2006, under the guidance of Malcolm Thomson and current coach Michael Nicholson.

External links
 Ravens Košice RC

Slovak rugby union teams
Rugby clubs established in 2010
Sport in Košice